This is a list of Estonian television related events from 1990.

Events
 21 June – Mart Siimann became the chief director of ETV.

Debuts

Television shows

Ending this year

Births

Deaths

See also
 1990 in Estonia

References

1990s in Estonian television